Brigadier-General Sir George Kynaston Cockerill,  (13 August 1867 – 19 April 1957) was a British Army officer and a Conservative Party politician.

Career
Cockerill was the son of the Surgeon-General Robert William Cockerill, and his wife Clara Sandys, daughter of Major-General Charles Pooley.

He joined the Queen's Royal Regiment (West Surrey) in February 1888, was promoted to a lieutenant on 26 June 1889, and served in the Hazara Expedition in 1891. From 1892 to 1895 he explored the eastern Hindu Kush, for which he won the MacGregor Memorial medal and was a gold medallist of the Royal United Services Institute in India. He served with the Chitral Relief Force in 1895, on the North-West Frontier of India from 1897 to 1898, and was promoted to captain (supernumerary) on 11 February 1899. He was a staff officer in the Second Boer War from 1900 to 1902, serving as deputy assistant adjutant general for communications from February 1900. For his war service, he was mentioned in despatches (dated 8 April 1902) and received the brevet promotion as major in the South African Honours list published on 26 June 1902. Following the end of the war, he received a regular commission as a captain in the 4th battalion Royal Warwickshire Regiment in August 1902, and left Cape Town on the SS Norman two months later to join his battalion at Dublin. In 1907 he became a major in the Royal Fusiliers (City of London Regiment), and retired in 1910. In retirement he served in the Special Reserve and in April 1914 was promoted to Lieutenant-Colonel to command the 7th (Extra Reserve) Battalion, Royal Fusiliers.

At the December 1910 general election he stood unsuccessfully as the Conservative candidate in the Thornbury division of Gloucestershire. He was British technical delegate at the Hague Conference in 1907. At the outbreak of World War I he mobilised the 7th Royal Fusiliers and then served in the War Office, first as Sub-Director of Military Operations, then as Deputy Director of Military Intelligence and Director of Special Intelligence with the rank of Brigadier-General. He received many honours for his wartime work, including being made a Companion of the Order of the Bath (military division) in 1916.

At the 1918 general election he was elected unopposed as the Member of Parliament (MP) for the Reigate division of Surrey, having stood as a Coalition Conservative. He was returned unopposed in 1922 and in 1923, and re-elected with large majorities in 1924 and 1929. He retired from the House of Commons at the 1931 general election, having been knighted in the King's Birthday Honours in 1926.

Publications
Sir George Cockerill. "Pioneer Exploration in Hunza and Chitral". The Himalayan Journal. Vol. 11. 1939. 14–41.

References

External links 
 

1867 births
1957 deaths
Conservative Party (UK) MPs for English constituencies
UK MPs 1918–1922
UK MPs 1922–1923
UK MPs 1923–1924
UK MPs 1924–1929
UK MPs 1929–1931
Knights Bachelor
Companions of the Order of the Bath
Queen's Royal Regiment officers
Royal Fusiliers officers
British Army personnel of the Second Boer War
Explorers of Central Asia
British Army generals of World War I
Royal Warwickshire Fusiliers officers
Recipients of the MacGregor Medal
British Army brigadiers